Deerwood may refer to:

Canada
 Deerwood, Manitoba

United States

Florida
Deerwood Inn motel and campground, Madison Florida
Deerwood Country Club, Jacksonville, Florida
Deerwood, a section of Jacksonville, Florida

Minnesota
Deerwood, Minnesota
Deerwood Township, Crow Wing County, Minnesota
Deerwood Township, Kittson County, Minnesota

Wyoming
Deerwood, Wyoming, unincorporated community in Albany County